Molinar is a surname. Notable people with the surname include:

Edoardo Molinar (1907–1994), Italian cyclist
Juan Molinar Horcasitas (born 1955), Mexican politician and academic
Iverson Molinar (born 1999), Panamanian basketball player

See also
Molina (surname)
Molinari
Molinaro